Judson Prentice (March 2, 1810 – July 27, 1886) was a member of the Wisconsin State Senate.

Biography
Prentice was born in Oriskany Falls, Oneida County, New York, to Lucy Stafford and Thomas Prentice. He lived in Erie County, New York for 30 years, where he met and married his first wife, Almira Woodruff. They had two children together before her death in July 1844. Shortly after her death, Prentice moved to Trenton, Dodge County, in the Wisconsin Territory, before eventually settling in Watertown, Wisconsin.

In 1848, Prentice married Olive Thompson, a Congregationalist from Riga, New York. They would have five children.

Career
Prentice represented Dodge County in the Wisconsin State Senate for two years.  In 1852, as the senator from the 10th District, and in 1853, after redistricting, as the senator from the 22nd District. Additionally, he was an alderman of Watertown, Wisconsin, Surveyor of Dodge County, and a justice of the peace. He was a member of the Whig Party.

Prentice died in Watertown at the age of 78.

References

People from Oneida County, New York
Politicians from Watertown, Wisconsin
Wisconsin state senators
Wisconsin city council members
American surveyors
American justices of the peace
Wisconsin Whigs
19th-century American politicians
1810 births
People from Trenton, Dodge County, Wisconsin
1886 deaths
19th-century American judges